Two Degrees is the fifth studio album by Illy. The album was released on 11 November 2016 and debuted at number 1 on the ARIA Albums Chart. It extended the record for most number-one albums in a calendar year by Australian artists in becoming the nineteenth such album. Singles by Illy from Two Degrees are "Papercuts" featuring Vera Blue (July 2016), 8 September 2017 "Catch 22" featuring Anne-Marie (October) and "Oh My" (May 2017) featuring Jenna McDougall.

Track listing

ONETWO003
 "Forget It" - 4:23
 "If Looks Could Kill" - 3:54
 "Hazard to Myself"  (featuring Sir the Baptist)  - 3:13
 "Oh My"  (featuring Jenna McDougall) - 3:30
 "Papercuts"  (featuring Vera Blue) - 4:15
 "Lightshow" - 3:51
 "Two Degrees" - 4:30
 "Catch 22"  (featuring Anne-Marie) - 3:41
 "Extra Extra"  (featuring Mike Waters) - 3:08
 "You Say When"  (featuring Marko Penn) - 3:49
 "Truce" - 4:15
 "Highway" - 4:12

Personnel 

 Illy (Alasdair David George Murray) – rapping
 Sir the Baptist – (track 3)
 Mikey Chan – guitar (track 4)
 Jenna McDougall – vocals (track 4)
 Vera Blue – vocals (track 5)
 Anne-Marie – vocals (track 8)
 Mike Waters – vocals (track 9)
 Marco Penn – vocals (track 10)

Charts

Weekly charts

Year-end charts

References

2016 albums
Illy (rapper) albums